The Mexico women's national field hockey team represents Mexico in women's international field hockey competitions.

Tournament history

World Cup
 1974 – 10th place
 1976 – 7th place
 1981 – 11th place

Pan American Games
 1991 – 4th place
 1999 – 7th place
 2011 – 6th place
 2015 – 6th place
 2019 – 6th place

Pan American Cup
 2001 – 6th place
 2009 – 6th place
 2013 – 5th place
 2017 – 6th place
 2022 – Withdrawn

Central American and Caribbean Games
 1986 – 4th place
 1990 – 
 1993 – 5th place
 1998 – 
 2002 – 4th place
 2006 – 6th place
 2010 – 
 2014 – 
 2018 – 
 2023 – Qualified

Hockey World League
 2014–15 – 25th place
 2016–17 – 29th place

FIH Hockey Series
2018–19 – Second round

See also
 Mexico men's national field hockey team

References

External links
FIH profile

Americas women's national field hockey teams
National team
Field hockey